American States Water Co. is an American water and electricity utility company. It was founded in 1929 and is headquartered in San Dimas, California. The company has 50-year privatization contracts with U.S. government as a government contractor for its water system service. It is the water utility provider for about 246,000 customers and the electricity provider for over 23,000 customers in Big Bear Lake and California under the name Bear Valley Electric.

Background
As of February 2014, the company has a market capitalization of $1.12 billion and an enterprise value of 1.42 billion. It operates its business through three segments including water, electric and contracted service.

The company is the parent company of Golden State Water Company (GSWC) and American States Utility Services, Inc. (ASUS) as well as its subsidiaries. GSWC serves more than 45,000 customers in California. ASUS is a contractor for the U.S. government.

On January 17, 2013, one of the company's subsidiaries, ASUS, implemented Deltek Contract Lifecycle Management (CLM), which deals with contract data, as a contract management system to help grow the business and maintain government compliance. In June 2013, GSWC entered into an agreement to purchase all of the operating assets of Rural Water Company, which used to serve approximately 1,000 customers in the county of San Luis Obispo, California, In the winter of 2014, the company continued to provide water service to the customer despite the California drought.

Locations

Golden State Water
Golden State Water operates systems based in:
San Dimas
Los Alamitos
West Orange County
Placentia
Yorba Linda
Cowan Heights
Central Basin East
Artesia
Norwalk
Central Basin West
Bell/Bell Gardens
Florence-Graham
Hollydale
Willowbrook
Claremont
Culver City
San Gabriel
South San Gabriel
South Arcadia
Barstow
Calipatria
Bay Point
Arden Cordova
Cordova
Arden
Robbins
Wrightwood
Los Osos
Los Osos
Edna
Santa Maria
Orcutt
Nipomo
Cypress Ridge
Lake Marie
Tanglewood
Simi Valley
Clearlake
Morongo Valley
Morongo del Sur 
Morongo del Norte 
Apple Valley
Desert View
Lucerne
North Apple Valley
South Apple Valley

References

External links
 
Official American States Water website

Electric power companies of the United States
Water companies of the United States
Energy in California
Hydroelectric power companies of the United States
Companies based in Los Angeles County, California
Energy companies established in 1929
Renewable resource companies established in 1929
1929 establishments in California
American companies established in 1929
Environment of Greater Los Angeles
San Dimas, California
Companies listed on the New York Stock Exchange